FK Detonit Junior was a football club based in the city of Radoviš, Republic of North Macedonia. They were recently competed in the Macedonian Second League.

History
The club was founded in 2014. In 2022, the club was merged with FK Plačkovica and youth team Azzurri and after that the club ceased operations.

References

External links
Club info at MacedonianFootball 
Football Federation of Macedonia 
Site of the title sponsor Detonit 

Association football clubs established in 2014
2014 establishments in the Republic of Macedonia
FK
Detonit Junior
Association football clubs disestablished in 2022
2022 disestablishments in North Macedonia